Jean Alban Bergonié, (born 1 October 1857 in Casseneuil, died 2 January 1925), was a French oncologist.

The Bergonié Institute - a regional centre cancer research in Bordeaux was founded by him.

His name is included on the Monument to the X-ray and Radium Martyrs of All Nations erected in Hamburg, Germany in 1936.

Sources
 Jean Bergonié, par Bernard Hoerni, Éd. Glyphe, 2007, .

People from Lot-et-Garonne
1857 births
1925 deaths
French oncologists